Paul Söllner (5 June 1911 – 8 April 1991) was a German rower who competed in the 1936 Summer Olympics.

He was born in Davos and died in Murnau am Staffelsee. In 1936 he won the gold medal as member of the German boat in the coxed four competition. He was member of the Ludwigshafener Ruderverein.

References

External links
 Profile on Database Olympics

1911 births
1991 deaths
Olympic rowers of Germany
Rowers at the 1936 Summer Olympics
Olympic gold medalists for Germany
Olympic medalists in rowing
German male rowers
Medalists at the 1936 Summer Olympics
Sportspeople from Ludwigshafen
People from Davos